Nepal Sanskrit University (formerly Mahendra Sanskrit University) was established in December 1986 and has its central office at Beljhundi in Dang district of Lumbini Province, Nepal. It is 13 km away from the city of Ghorahi.

Academics

The university offers Bachelor (Shastri), Bachelor of Education, Masters (Acharya) and Doctoral courses in classical and modern subjects. It offers Bachelors Of Ayurvedic Medicine And Surgery (BAMS), and going to start Institute of Sthapatya (IOS) also condensed courses for Ayurvedacharya.

The university has 12 constituent and 13 affiliated Vidhyapeetha (Campuses) around the country.

Inspired by the long unbroken tradition of Sanskrit in Nepal, the university was established for the following purposes:

To fulfill the need for an autonomous institution for teaching/learning activities and research of Sanskrit at many levels.
To systematize Sanskrit education up to the highest level in the country.
To preserve and promote Sanskrit education in sectors of Nepalese society.
To develop the Nepal into a center for learning through Sanskrit education.

NSU offers facilities for degree and non-degree research works based on Sanskrit. It organizes training programs on Vedic and Buddhist teaching and Yoga training.

Administration
The Prime Minister is the chancellor of Nepal Sanskrit University. The pro-chancellor is the Minister for Education. The vice-chancellor is the chief administrator.

On May 12, 2002, fire caused 27.5 million rupees worth of damage.

Affiliated campuses
Balmiki Vidyapith, Kathmandu
Pindeshwor Vidyapeeth, Dharan, Sunsari
Janata Vidyapith, Dang
Bishow Bidhalaya Vidyapith, Beljhundi, Dang
Central Ayurveda Vidyapith, Beljhundi, Dang
Kalika Sanskrit Vidyapith, Nawalpur
Harihar Sanskrit Vidyapith, Argakhanchi
Sharada Vidyapith, Mahandranagar, Kanchanpur
BPK Sanskrit Vidyapith, Solukhumbu
Bhanu Sanskrit Vidyapith, Tanahun
Vindabashini Vidyapith, Kaski
Yjnayavalkya Lakshminarayan Vidyapeeth, Matihani, Mahottari
RuRu Sanskrit Vidyapith, Gulmi
Janakhajari Vidyapith, Janakpur, Dhanusha
Radhadamodar Sanskrit Vidyapith, Syangja

References

Universities and colleges in Nepal
Sanskrit
Ayurvedic colleges
Educational institutions established in 1986
1986 establishments in Nepal
Buildings and structures in Dang District, Nepal